Kokota (also known as Ooe Kokota) is spoken on Santa Isabel Island, which is located in the Solomon Island chain in the Pacific Ocean. Santa Isabel is one of the larger islands in the chain, but it has a very low population density. Kokota is the main language of three villages: Goveo and Sisigā on the North coast, and Hurepelo on the South coast, though there are a few speakers who reside in the capital, Honiara, and elsewhere. The language is classified as a 6b (threatened) on the Graded Intergenerational Disruption Scale (GIDS). To contextualize '6b', the language is not in immediate danger of extinction since children in the villages are still taught Kokota and speak it at home despite English being the language of the school system. However, Kokota is threatened by another language, Cheke Holo, as speakers of this language move from the west of the island closer to the Kokota-speaking villages. Kokota is one of 37 languages in the Northwestern Solomon Group, and as with other Oceanic languages, it has limited morphological complexity.

Kokota uses little affixation and instead relies heavily on cliticization, full and partial reduplication, and compounding. Phonologically, Kokota has a diverse array of vowels and consonants and makes interesting use of stress assignment. Regarding its basic syntax, Kokota is consistently head-initial. The sections below expand on each of these topics to give an overview of the Kokota language.

Phonology
The phonemic inventory of Kokota consists of 22 consonants and 5 vowels.

Vowels
Kokota has five vowel phonemes as shown in the International Phonetic Alphabet (IPA) chart below and uses no phonemic diphthongs.

Kokota does not contain any phonemic diphthongs; however, they do occur in normal speech. Only certain vowel sequences are eligible for diphthongisation. Sequences may only diphthongise if the second vowel present is higher than the first. Front-back and back-front movements are not eligible to become diphthongs. Diphthongisation is also not restricted by morpheme boundaries. Thus, any sequence of eligible vowels may diphthongise.

Consonants
Kokota orthography is heavily influenced by that of Cheke Holo. For instance, glottal stops are not phonemic in Kokota but are often written with an apostrophe (as in Cheke Holo) when they occur in certain nondistinctive environments, such as to mark morpheme boundaries between neighboring vowels. Similarly, Cheke Holo distinguishes j and z but Kokota does not. Nevertheless, Kokota speakers tend to use either letter to write phonemic . The macron is used to write the voiced velar plosive  and the velar nasal .

Most consonants distinguish voiceless and voiced versions (left and right respectively in each cell in the table). Kokota presents a rather uncommon set of consonant phonemes in that each and every phoneme exists in a pair with its voiced or voiceless opposite. There are 22 consonant phonemes in total – 11 place and manner pairs of voiced and voiceless  and five contrastive manners. Two are obstruent classes which are fricative and plosive and three are sonorant classes which are lateral, nasal, and rhotic. Its six fricative phonemes make Kokota a relative outlier in Oceanic, where 2–3 fricatives are usual.
The amount of voiced and voiceless consonants and vowels is nearly equal with the percentage being 52% voiced and 48% voiceless.

Syllable structure 

Kokota uses three types of syllable structure for the most part: V, CV, and CCV. Most (88% of 746 syllables examined) are CV (V and CCV each represent 6%). However, there are also rare cases where a CCVV or CVV syllable may occur. Thus, Kokota structure is: (C)(C)V(V). Final consonant codas usually occur only in words borrowed from another language. The CCVV structure is extremely rare as Kokota does not use phonemic 'diphthongs' and the term simply refers to two vowels occurring in sequence in a single syllable. The second consonant (C2) must be a voiced coronal sonorant (or ). The table below illustrates the possible CC onset cluster pairings.

The table below contains representations of the basic, productive syllable structures in Kokota.

Stress 
Kokota uses trochaic stress patterns (stressed-unstressed in sequence, counting from the left edge of a word). Stress in the language varies widely among speakers, but there are patterns to the variation. Three main factors contribute to this variability: the limited morphology of Kokota, the fact some words are irregular by nature, and finally because of the present transition in stress assignment. The language is currently in a period of transition as it moves from relying on stress assignment based on moras and moves to stress assignment by syllable. The age of the speaker is a defining factor in stress use as members of older generations assign stress based on weight while younger generations assign stress based on syllables, placing main stress on the leftmost syllable of the word.

Example 1 
Words can be divided into syllables (σ) and feet (φ) and syllables may be divided further into moras (μ). Two moras grouped together comprise a foot. An important restriction on foot formation in Kokota is that their construction cannot split moras of the same syllable. For example, a word that has three syllables CV.CV.CVV has four moras, CV, CV, CV, V. These moras are split into two feet: [CV.CV] and [CVV].

Assigning stress based on mora uses bimoraic feet to determine where a word receives stress. The first mora is stressed, though in speech the whole syllable receives stress so  is stressed in this word (see below where the stressed syllable is bolded).

                                      
                                      φ: ,         -
                                      σ: ,         

In contrast, a younger speaker of Kokota would assign stress based on bisyllabic feet. Following the syllable structure above,  is again the stressed syllable but this is simply coincidental as stress is assigned to the first syllable. This coincidence will not always be the case as demonstrated in the next example, below.

Example 2 
For older speakers, the feet are assigned differently than in  because ordinary foot assignment would take the first two moras and thus would split the  syllable.

                                      
                                      φ: - ,      
                                      σ: ,      

A younger speaker uses the simpler, syllable-based foot parsing: stress thus falls on the first syllable  while the second syllable  is unstressed.

Verb complex 
In the Kokota language there are two layers to the verb complex: an inner layer and an outer layer. The inner layer is the verb core which is transparent to any sentence modifiers. The outer layer can alter the verb core altogether. Constituent modifiers can modify the verb complex in a sentence in addition to the inner and outer layers of verb complexes.

Verb compounding 
Compound verbs stem from multiple verbs. The left-hand root is the verb and the right-hand can be a noun, verb, or adjective. The phrase all together acts as a verb phrase.

Table retrieved from Kokota Grammar by Bill Palmer, Honolulu, US: University of Hawaii Press, 2008.

Reduplication 
Kokota shows full and partial reduplication of disyllabic roots.

Partial reduplication 
In some cases partial reduplication shows the change of a noun to a verb; nouns from verbs; slight noun from noun differentiation; slight verb from verb differentiation; derived form of a habitual, ongoing, or diminutive event.

Tables retrieved from Kokota Grammar by Bill Palmer, Honolulu, US: University of Hawaii Press, 2008.

Full reduplication 
There is only a small number of full reduplication of disyllabic roots in the Kokota language. Below are examples of full reduplication where the relationship is idiosyncratic:

Tables retrieved from Kokota Grammar by Bill Palmer, Honolulu, US: University of Hawaii Press, 2008.

One example shows full reduplication deriving verbs from transitive roots, and nouns from verbs:

Tables retrieved from Kokota Grammar by Bill Palmer, Honolulu, US: University of Hawaii Press, 2008.

Clause structure (syntax) 
Syntax in Kokota follows the basic sequential order: subject -> verb -> object.

An example is shown below.

Subject: 
Verb: 
Object:

Equative clauses 
Equative clauses represent a characteristic of the subject in the sentence. In the Kokota language moods are unmarked. In equatives, the subject agreement component in verb clauses are excluded.

Telling time 
When telling the time; time is the subject. Telling time in units less than an hour is expressed by a NP that expresses the minutes numerically attached to a possessor that expresses the hour. Terms like 'half past' or 'quarter to' cannot be expressed in Kokota.

Table retrieved from Kokota Grammar by Bill Palmer, Honolulu, US: University of Hawaii Press, 2008.

Topicalization 
Topicalized subjects in Kokota are in the preverbal position. Any subject can be topicalized but rarely in natural conversation.

Table retrieved from Kokota Grammar by Bill Palmer, Honolulu, US: University of Hawaii Press, 2008.

Below is a table of the breakdown position occurrence of the first 100 verbal clauses in a normal text:

Table retrieved from Kokota Grammar by Bill Palmer, Honolulu, US: University of Hawaii Press, 2008.

Morphology

Nouns

Cliticization 
By adding two clitics on to the root noun , Kokota specifies who possesses it as well as its proximity, as shown in the gloss below.

 is the root meaning 'blood';  indicates first-person singular possessive ('my').

A more complex form of cliticization occurs in the example sentence below:

(Notes: the standing stones have spiritual significance; NT is the indicator of neutral modality; CNT is continuous; NV refers to something that is not visible.)

Partial reduplication 
Partial reduplication in Kokota generally derives nouns from verbs. Below are two examples:

Compounding (nouns) 
Both endocentric and exocentric compounding occur.

Endocentric compounding 
Endocentric compounding in Kokota results in words that serve the grammatical purpose that one of its constituent words does. There are three examples below.

Exocentric compounding 
Exocentric compounding in Kokota results in words that do not serve the grammatical purpose that any of the constituent words do. There are two examples below.

Pronouns
There exist four sets of pronominal forms: preverbal subject indexed auxiliaries, post verbal object indexing, possessor indexing and independent pronouns . Complying with typical Oceanic features, Kokota distinguishes between four person categories: first-person inclusive, first-person exclusive, second person, and third person. The preverbal subject indexing auxiliaries do not differentiate between singular and plural, whereas possessor and postverbal object indexing do – except in first-person inclusive, where no singular is possible .

Non-independent: subject pronouns
The preverbal subject-indexing pronouns do not distinguish number .

Non-independent: object pronouns
The object-indexing pronouns are postverbal clitics .

Non-independent: possessor pronouns
The possessor-indexing pronouns are suffixed to nouns .

Independent: focal pronouns
The independent pronouns, however, go one step further and differentiate between singular, dual, trial and plural numbers .

Possessive constructions
Similarly to many Oceanic languages, Kokota makes the distinction between alienable possession and inalienable possession.

Inalienable
Inalienable possession consists of possessor indexing enclitics attaching to the nominal core of the possessed noun phrase as follows :

Alienable
Alienable possession is formed with a possessive base that is indexed to the possessor. This entire unit precedes the possessed noun phrase.

Negation 
In Kokota negative construction is expressed in two ways. One way is through the use of the negative particle  and the other way is by the means of the subordinating construction that involves the negative existential verb  meaning 'not exist'/ 'be.not'.

Negative particle 
Negation is constructed when an auxiliary verb is suffixed with the negative participle . When the negative particle  is suffixed onto the auxiliary, it creates a single complex auxiliary as the particle  also combines with other tense and aspect particles. Depending on the clause type the negative particle  can occur with or without the subordinating construction to instigate negation in a clause.

The negative particle  can be used to express negation in many types of clauses including the 'be thus' clause, nominal clauses and with equative predicates.

Negation in 'be thus' clause 
When the negative particle  is situated in a 'be thus' clause the particle  suffixes itself onto the auxiliary in the verb complex of the 'be thus' clause. The verb complex within the 'be thus' clause consist of the single worded verb  'be thus', the auxiliary, tense and aspect particles. Below is an example. 

This example shows how the negative particle  is suffixed onto the irrealis auxiliary  and also attached to the 'be thus' verb  to negate the verb complex.

Negation in nominalised clause 
When the negative particle  expresses negation is it usually suffixed onto the auxiliary verb in the nominalised clause.

In this example, the particle  is not suffixed onto an auxiliary. This is because the auxiliary is an irrealis as this is discussing the past. Irrealis auxiliaries are omittable parts of Kokota speech when there is no ambiguity.  As this example is not ambiguous, the irrealis auxiliary is omitted.

Negation in equative predicate 
The formation of a negative equatives predicates is similar to the 'be thus' clause and nominalised clause where the negative particle is suffixed onto the auxiliary of the verb complex. This is demonstrated below.

Negation in imperative clause 
Negation in imperative clauses can be expressed by the negative particle  or the subordinating construction. However, it is more common to use the negative particle  to construct negation in an imperative clause as is the most frequently used and preferred strategy. Below is an example of how it is done.

Subordinating construction 
Negation is expressed through the subordinating construction involves the negative existential verb .  This subordinating construction is commonly used to negate declarative clauses.

Negative existential verb  
The negative existential verb  expresses 'not exist'/ 'be.not' and it is the antonym of the positive existential verb , meaning 'exist'. Unlike the positive existential verb , which has both locative and existential functions,  can only function in an existential sense. Below are examples of negation using the negative existential verb :

In the example above, there is a locative adjunct present. However, it does not modify  as it is a part of a relative clause. The more literal translation of the example would be 'Someone who looks after the Government's law in our village does not exist'. So, the main clause expresses the absence of the subject as an entity, rather than the subject not being in the location of the village.

The negative existential verb  is unlike  as it does not have a locative function. To express that an entity has no presence in a location involves the subordinating construction. Below are two examples. Example 7 exhibits how  functions when in a locative sense; whereas, Example 8 exhibits the subordinating construction involving  to show non-presence in a location.

Negation in declarative clause 
Negation is expressed in a declarative clause through subordinating construction. Through this process the declarative clause becomes a subordinated positive declarative clause which complements the negative existential verb . Below is an example of a negatived declarative clause. 

In this example the subordinated positive declarative clause has been bracketed to show its placement in the main clause in relation to the negative existential verb .

Phrases 
Below are phrases spoken in Kokota by a native speaker named Nathaniel Boiliana as he reminisced about World War II:

Numerals 
The numeral system of Kokota has many typologically odd features and shows significant lexical replacement. In the numbers up to ten, only 'seven'  (< ) is a clear Proto-Oceanic reflex. The higher numerals also alternate between multiples of ten (e.g. Ross describes it as one of the most bizarre numeral systems attested for an Oceanic language.

Abbreviations 

3SGO:third person 'object'
3SGP:third person possessor
CS:causative particle
EXC:exclusive
IMM:immediacy marker
LOC:locative preposition
NEG:negative particle
NSP:non-specific referent
NT:neutral modality
PRG:progressive aspect
PNLOC:location name
PRF:perfective aspect
PRS:present tense
RL:realis modality
RL-3S:realis 3rd person subject
SB:subordinator
SBJ:subject indexing
SPC:specific referent suffix

Notes

References 
 
Palmer, B. (1999). Kokota Grammar, Santa Isabel, Solomon Islands. (PhD dissertation, University of Sydney, Australia). Retrieved from http://www.smg.surrey.ac.uk/languages/northwest-solomonic/kokota/kokota-grammar/ 
 
 Palmer, B. (2008). Kokota Grammar. Honolulu, US: University of Hawaii Press. Retrieved from http://www.ebrary.com
 

Ysabel languages
Languages of the Solomon Islands
Vulnerable languages